The American Bully is a modern breed of dog that was developed as a companion dog, and originally standardized and recognized as a breed in 2004 by the American Bully Kennel Club (ABKC). Their published breed standard describes the dog as giving the "impression of great strength for its size". In 2008, the American Bully was recognized by the European Bully Kennel Club (EBKC), and on July 15, 2013, by the United Kennel Club (UKC).  Neither The Kennel Club nor American Kennel Club (AKC) have recognized or accepted the American Bully into their registry as a purebred dog. The founding registry (ABKC) divided the American Bully into four categories, including the Pocket, Standard, Classic, and XL, whereas other registries, including the UKC, have approved one consistent size standard.

There are several types, ranging from pocket to XXL in size and weight. Temperament in adult dogs is very much dependent on training, and the breed can be very demanding and needs to be properly trained.

History 
The American Bully, as it is now known, began development in the 1980s with the majority of the final behavioral and aesthetic product being completed in the 1990s. There is consensus that at least five other breeds were used to attain the more "bully" physical traits desired as well as the more diminutive size of some lines. The American Pit Bull Terrier (APBT) was the foundation (parent breed) used to create the American Bully. The APBT has maintained a characteristic appearance and temperament for over a century. Within that span of time different strains of APBT emerged within the breed, each with different physical attributes. One particular APBT strain was crossbred to create a specific, stockier, physique that breeders originally misrepresented as purebred American Pit Bull Terriers. Eventually, enough breeders agreed that these dogs were disparate enough from American Pit Bull Terriers that it warranted them admitting that they were different breed altogether. The bloodline of these mixed breeds were further influenced with further, openly acknowledged breeding to the American Bulldog, English Bulldog, and Olde English Bulldogge in order to fine-tune desired physical characteristics and personality traits.

The breed was first recognized by its breed club, the American Bully Kennel Club (ABKC), in 2004. This registry first acted as a means to document pedigrees and show the breed against its written standard. According to the ABKC the initial desire for this breed was to produce a dog with a lower prey drive and more of the "bully" traits and characteristics than the American Staffordshire Terrier. Mass and heavy bone was prioritized to ensure such a look, and due to this many of the dogs shown today display the wide front for which they were originally bred.

The breed's development and popularity are commonly tied to the growth of hip-hop culture. The American Bully should not be confused with the several other bulldog-type breeds.

Varieties 
Within the ABKC, the four varieties are separated by height without specification of weight. All these varieties are expected to follow the same standard with minor alterations.

All dogs are classified and shown as Standard until they reach a year of age, at which point they are separated into the varieties and shown against their own type.

Standard 

The standard American Bully type is a medium-sized dog with a compact bulky muscular body, heavy bone structure and blocky head. Male dogs must be , while females must be .

Pocket 

XL 

Classic 
The classic is a lighter-framed dog than the standard, but falls within the same height range. These dogs do not display the exaggerated features often found in the other varieties, and arguably display clearer American Pit Bull Terrier/American Staffordshire Terrier lineage.

Non-standard sizes 
Outside of the breed standard, dogs shorter or taller than the named variations have been bred. Smaller dogs are sometimes called "Micro", and larger ones are called "XXL", but neither are recognized by the kennel clubs as legitimate varieties.

Temperament 
The American Bully is a highly adaptable and trainable breed. Many dogs, despite acting as lapdogs in the home, do well in sports such as weight pull and flirt pole. Human aggression is discouraged in breed standards, however a level of dog aggression is characteristic of the breed. Breeders have acknowledged that American Bully dogs can be very dangerous if improperly raised or bred. On July 16, 2022, Joanne Robinson of Rotherham, England, was killed in her own home when she was attacked by her pet American Bully XL. The dog, one of a pair, was reputed to weigh . Furthermore, on August 10 of the same year, another attack by the breed against a person was reported. Ian Symes, an experienced and professional dog-walker, was mauled to death while walking through a park in Fareham, Hampshire.

In 2022, six fatal dog attacks in the UK listed American Bully as the breed responsible for the attacks, with victims ranging in ages from 17 months to 62 years old.

Health 
Health problems vary within the breed and span the entire spectrum, with some varieties being plagued by problems, and others being well-documented for health and quality. Testing is not as commonplace in the breed as in older breeds, though hip and elbow scoring are the most frequently conducted. Cherry eye, ectropion, and entropion are often seen affecting the eyes, while Brachycephalic Respiratory Syndrome can be seen in the shorter muzzled dogs.

Legal status
In Turkey, it is illegal to own and breed an American Bully.

See also 
 American Staffordshire Terrier
Bulldog type
 Cephalic index
 Pit bull 
 Bull-type terriers
 Boxer

External links

 American Bully Kennel Club
 European Bully Kennel Club
 United Kennel Club - American Bully Standard
 American Bully Association

References 

Dog breeds originating in the United States
Companion dogs